Chapel Langley is an inner city district of Luton just south west of the town centre, in the Borough of Luton, in the ceremonial county of Bedfordshire, England. It is roughly bounded by Regent Street and Adelaide Street to the north, Wilsden Avenue and Bolingbroke Road to the south, Milton Road, Napier Road, and Grove Road to the west, and Castle Street and London Road to the east. Chapel Langley is one of the oldest areas of the now sprawling conurbation of Luton.

On the edge of the town centre, the area contains 19th century terraced housing, churches and pubs, as well as some newer inter-war and post-war housing and flats.

Politics 
Chapel Langley is part of South ward, which is represented by Cllr David Agbley (Labour), Cllr Fatima Begum (Labour) and Cllr Javeria Hussain (Labour).

The ward forms part of the parliamentary constituency of Luton South and the MP is Rachel Hopkins (Labour).

References 

Areas of Luton